David James "Stoney" Mason (April 28, 1931 – March 26, 2020) was a master stone-wall mason from Starksboro, Vermont. He was born in the village of Starksboro and lived his whole life there. His dry stone stacking technique has been rarely used in the last two centuries. Dry stone stacking means placing each stone in direct contact with another without the use of mortar or any other adhesive agent. He has been given several awards, been covered by Vermont Life Magazine and other publications and had the honor of constructing a stone wall on the Washington D.C. Mall as part of the  2001 Folklife Festival. David lived in the village of Starksboro with his wife Bette. David's son Rick is also a stone-wall mason. David died on March 26, 2020.

References

October issue of Vermont Life (not listed online anymore)
Non-PDF version of link 3

1931 births
2020 deaths
People from Starksboro, Vermont
American stonemasons